Joan Kilbourn (15 June 1936 — 10 May 2011) was an American microbiologist and educator.

Early life and education 
Kilbourn was born June 15, 1936 in Juneau, Alaska. Her parents were Iris ( Chenoweth) and Jesse Payne.

Kilbourn attended Willamette University from 1954 to 1957 before transferring to the University of Oregon Medical School  to finish her B.S. degree in general science 1958. She earned her M.S. in Microbiology in 1960, and had a special interest in Biochemistry.

In 1963, Kilbourn earned a Ph.D. in Microbiology from Oregon State University, again focusing on Biochemistry and adding the study of Mathematics; her dissertation was titled "Use of a Radiation Resistant Organism as a Protectant from Lethal Effects of Irradiation in Mice."

Employment 
After completing her Ph.D., Kilbourn held a variety of positions, including teaching university students in the University of Oregon's Biology Department and continuing education classes for medical technologists at Portland State University, Clackamas Community College, and Physicians Medical Laboratory. She also worked at OHSU's Microbiology and Pediatrics departments and for the Veterans Affairs Hospital.

Kilbourn started the Consulting Clinical and Microbiological Laboratory in 1984 and oversaw its operation until her health declined in 2002.

Awards and service 
Kilbourn was recognized by the American Association for the Advancement of Science, Willamette University, and as an “Oregon Women of Achievement” by the State of Oregon for her work in science.

Kilbourn co-founded a chapter of Iota Sigma Pi and served as president.

References

American microbiologists
University of Oregon alumni
Oregon State University alumni
People from Juneau, Alaska
1936 births
2011 deaths
American women scientists
21st-century American women